Akaki Castle, also known as the Tower of the Franks is a castle in Cyprus. It served as a retreat for the kings of Cyprus.

History
The Akaki Castle is situated near the village of the same name, halfway between Nicosia and Morphou Bay. In 1191, Cyprus was taken by Richard the Lionheart during his campaign against the island's ruler Isaac Komnenos of Cyprus. Richard subsequently sold the island to the Knights Templar whose rule abruptly ended after a major revolt in Nicosia. Cyprus was thus resold to the Guy of Lusignan of the House of Lusignan. A period of peace ended with the death of Hugh I of Cyprus in 1218. A struggle over who should act as the kingdom's regent ensued, pitting the House of Ibelin with the local supporters of Frederick II, Holy Roman Emperor. Frederick's arrival in Limassol in 1228 escalated the conflict into an open war. Afterwards, the Lusignans continued their reign interrupted only by occasional palace coups. One such coup took place during the reign of Henry II of Jerusalem who was deposed by Amalric, Lord of Tyre and exiled to the Armenian Kingdom of Cilicia. Upon Amalric's death in 1310, Henry returned to Cyprus. He then proceeded to arrest those responsible for his exile, among the most notorious rebels was Balian II of Ibelin, Prince of Galilee. Balian's property at Akaki was confiscated, and a castle was erected in order to strengthen the king's authority in the area. Akaki remained a royal demesne and was described as a court, where Peter I of Cyprus spent several days hunting in January 1369. James II of Cyprus similarly used Akaki as a retreat from the plague that ravaged Nicosia from 1470 to 1473.

Architecture
Next to nothing remains of Akaki today. Constructed of large stone blocks, the tower once had two to three floors as well as a small window above the remains of an internal staircase. Its small size indicates that it could accommodate up to three people.

Footnotes

References

 
 
 

Crusader castles in Cyprus
Nicosia District